Royal Albert Hall is a building in London.

Albert Hall may also refer to:

People
Albert R. Hall (Minnesota and Wisconsin politician) (1841–1905)
Albert Hall (engineer) (1878–1941), English engineer and inventor
Bert Hall (cricketer) (fl. 1902)
Bert Hall (footballer, born 1882) (1882–1957), footballer who played for Aston Villa and England
Albert R. Hall (Indiana politician) (1884–1969), U.S. Representative from Indiana
Bert Hall (1885–1948), actor and military aviator
Albert Hall (footballer, born 1918) (1918–1998), footballer who played for Tottenham Hotspur and Plymouth Argyle
Albert Hall (athlete) (1934–2008), American hammer thrower
Albert Hall (actor) (born 1937), American actor
Albert Hall (baseball) (born 1958), outfielder

Buildings
Albert Hall, Adelaide (1880–1899), an entertainment venue in Adelaide, Australia
Albert Hall, Brisbane, a former church hall and theatre in Brisbane, Australia
Albert Hall, Canberra, a building in Canberra, Australia
Albert Hall, Launceston, a building in Launceston, Tasmania, Australia
Albert Hall Museum, Jaipur, India
Albert Hall, Llandrindod Wells, a theatre in Llandrindod Wells, Wales, UK
Albert Hall Music Hall, a former music hall in Kingston-upon-Hull, England, UK
Albert Hall, Manchester, England, UK
Albert Hall, Nottingham, a conference centre and concert hall in Nottingham, England, UK

Other uses
GWR 4900 Class 4965 Rood Ashton Hall or Albert Hall, a steam locomotive

See also
Bert Hall (disambiguation)

Hall, Albert
Architectural disambiguation pages